Irreligion in Bangladesh is rare and uncommon publicly. A Gallup survey conducted between 2014 - 2015 found that approximately less than 1% of Bangladeshis identified as convinced atheists as all the respondents reported as having or believing in a religion. Bangladesh has 166.3 million people as of 2021 estimation.

Persecution of Irreligious people

Many secularist or irreligious bloggers who supported the anti-Islamist protests occurred came under attack following the protests. Amnesty International noted with concern the rise in communal violence against religious minorities, including attacks on Hindus.

In early April 2013, the police began arresting bloggers for hurting religious sentiments. Four bloggers, Subrata Adhikary Shuvo, Russell Parvez, Mashiur Rahman Biplob and Asif Mohiuddin (who was still recovering from his wounds), were arrested within days of one another. The blog, Amar Blog, was also taken down. A religious group called Hefazat-e-Islam Bangladesh called for the hanging of the bloggers. Asif Mohiuddin's blog was shut down by the Bangladesh Telecommunication Regulatory Commission, and he was jailed for posting "offensive comments about Islam and Mohammed." The secular government arrested several other bloggers and blocked about a dozen websites and blogs, as well as giving police protection to some bloggers.

International organisations, including Human Rights Watch, Amnesty International, Reporters without Borders and the Committee to Protect Journalists condemned the imprisonment of bloggers and the climate of fear for journalists. Worldwide protest and demonstrations were held on in 2013 to put pressure on the Bangladeshi government to free the arrested bloggers. Several humanist groups (including the IHEU, the Center for Inquiry, the British Humanist Association, American Atheists and the Secular Coalition for America) called for their release, among others including Salman Rushdie, Taslima Nasrin, Hemant Mehta, Maryam Namazie, PZ Myers, Avijit Roy, Abu Ahammad, Ajoy Roy, Qayyum Chowdhury, Ramendu Majumdar and Muhammad Zafar Iqbal.

Taslima Nasrin, an author and self-described atheist, used to criticise rising religious fundamentalism and government inaction in her newspaper columns and books. In early 1992, mobs began attacking bookstores stocking her work. The same year she was assaulted at a book fair and her passport was confiscated. In July 1993, her novel Lajja was banned by the government on the claims that it created misunderstanding among the communities. On 23 September 1993, a fatwa was issued for her death. After international pressure, her passport returned in April 1994. She travelled to France and returned via India. On 4 July 1994, an arrest warrant was issued for hurting religious feelings and Nasrin went underground. On 3 August, she was granted bail, but she fled to Sweden and remained in exile. In 1998, she visited her critically ill mother in Bangladesh. In 2005, she moved to India and applied for citizenship.

In 2003, Bangladeshi author Humayun Azad wrote a book about an Islamic fundamentalist group Jamaat-ul-Mujahideen Bangladesh collaborating with the Pakistani army during the 1971 Bangladesh Liberation War. Azad received numerous death threats from fundamentalists until his death the next year. In May 2015, Humayun Azad's son, blogger Ananya Azad, was repeatedly threatened with death after publishing critiques of Islamist fundamentalism. He was subsequently forced into exile in Europe.

On 15 January 2013, Asif Mohiuddin, a self-styled atheist blogger (rational, gentle and Anti-Islamist), was stabbed near his office in Dhaka. He survived the attack. On 15 February 2013, Ahmed Rajib Haider, a prominent anti-Islamist blogger, was found murdered by a machete outside his Dhaka home. Mohiuddin, a winner of the BOBs award for online activism, was on an Islamist hit list that also included the murdered sociology professor Shafiul Islam.

On the night of 7 March 2013, an atheist blogger Sunnyur Rahaman was attacked by two men who swooped on him and hacked him with machetes while shouting "Allahu Akbar". He came under attack around 9:00 pm near Purabi Cinema Hall in Mirpur. By the support of local police he was rushed to Dhaka Medical College and Hospital with wounds in his head, neck, right leg and left hand.

On 26 February 2015, Avijit Roy, the founder of the Mukto-Mona blog, and his wife were attacked in Dhaka with machete-wielding assailants. Roy died on his way to the hospital. His wife was also seriously injured and lost a finger.

On 30 March 2015, blogger Washiqur Rahman was killed in a similar attack in Dhaka. The police arrested two suspects near the scene and recovered meat cleavers from them. The suspects said they killed Rahman due to his anti-Islamic articles.

On 12 March 2015, another blogger Ananta Bijoy Das was attacked and murdered by masked men wielding machetes. Ananta Bijoy Das was the editor of the science magazine Jukti.

List of prominent irreligious Bangladeshis
 Humayun Azad
 Ananta Bijoy Das
 Daud Haider
 Taslima Nasrin
 Avijit Roy
 Ahmed Sharif
 Mufassil Islam
 Asif Mohiuddin
 Asad Noor
 Bonya Ahmed

See also
 Persecution of atheists
 Irreligion by country
 Religion in Bangladesh
 2013 Bengali blog blackout
 Political repression of cyber-dissidents
 List of journalists killed in Bangladesh
 Nazimudden Samad

References

Bangladesh
Religion in Bangladesh
Persecution by Muslims
Attacks on secularists in Bangladesh
Islamism in Bangladesh
Irreligion in Bangladesh